Mrugaya (English: The Hunt) is a 1989 Malayalam drama film written by A. K. Lohithadas and directed by I. V. Sasi. The film stars Mammootty and Sunitha in the lead role, with Thilakan, Jagathy Sreekumar, Lalu Alex and Urvashi in supporting roles. It tells the story of Varunni (Mammootty), the uncultured and drunkard hunter who arrives in the village to kill a man-eating leopard. The film won two Kerala State Film Awards. The leopard, used in a number of scenes in the film, was lent by animal trainer Govindarajan Naidu. Sasi had said that, the climax fight scene with leopard was done by Mammootty without dupes.

Mammootty Mrugaya become biggest blockbuster and character Varunni become cult status and Mammootty different look and natural acting help the success

Plot 
The story takes place in a Highrange village, terrorised by the frequent attacks of a man eating leopard. Tired of waiting for help from the authorities, the villagers under Reverend Father Panangodan and Philipose Muthalali decide to hire a hunter. The hunter whom they wanted had recently died, so his son Varunni is summoned to the village. The uncultured life of Varunni soon became a headache for the village. The villagers try to avoid Varunni, who is a drunkard.

However, a woman named Bhagyalakshmi (whose mother was killed by the leopard) befriends Varunni. This relation makes Thomaskutty, who is in love with Bhagyalakshmi, jealous. Seeing Varunni talking to Bhagyalakshmi, Thomaskutty gets angry and starts fighting with the hunter. In the fight, Thomaskutty accidentally slips and falls from the top of the cliff. Varunni feels responsible for the death of Thomaskutty and confesses secretly to Father Panangodan. Father Panangodan realises the big heart inside the hunter. He decides to protect Varunni despite the objections from the villagers and arranges a livelihood for him. Varunni gradually starts to help the villagers and the family of Thomaskutty. The villagers also develop a soft corner for the hunter. Meanwhile, the leopard again comes to the village and Varunni fails to kill it. The leopard escapes with a wound.

The preparations of the betrothal of Thomaskutty's sister Annamma is going on. But the groom fails to show up at the function. At the directions of Father Panangodan, Varunni decides to marry Annamma. This makes Bhagyalakshmi, who was in love with Varunni, jealous. On the eve of the wedding, she informs Annamma that Varunni had killed her brother Thomaskutty. Varunni gets exposed on the wedding day and flees to his hut. On reaching the hut, Varunni finds his dog barking alarmingly. He concludes that the dog has rabies and kills it. Soon he spots the leopard at the top of his hut and realizes that his dog was actually warning about the leopard. He manages to kill the leopard with an axe. The villagers celebrate the death of the leopard. However, the police soon arrives and arrests Varunni for murdering Thomaskutty. He confesses to Annamma that he accidentally killed Thomaskutty.

Cast 
 Mammootty as Varunni
 Sunitha as Bhagyalakshmi
 Thilakan as Reverend Father Panangodan
 Urvashi as Annamma
 Jagathy Sreekumar as lawyer Ramankutty
 Lalu Alex as Anthony
 Sankaradi as Shankunni
 Kuthiravattom Pappu as Kunjabdullah
 Jagannatha Varma as Philipose Muthalali
 Bheeman Raghu as Kunjachan
 Paravoor Bharathan as Pillai
 Mahesh as Thomaskutty
 Kunjandi as Kuriachan
 Shari as Selina
 Vaishnavi as Radhamani
 Kousalya as Zeenath
 Priya as Yashoda

Release
The film was released on 23 December 1989.

Box office
The film was both commercially blockbuster and critically acclaimed.

Music
Lyrics for this movie was written by Sreekumaran Thampi and music was composed by Shankar–Ganesh.

Tracks

 Orikkal Niranjum sung by KJ Yesudas
Oru Nadam sung by K J Yesudas K.S.Chithra

Accolades
 Kerala State Film Award for Best Director – IV Sasi
 Kerala State Film Award for Best Actor – Mammootty

References

External links 

1989 films
1980s Malayalam-language films
Indian drama films
Films scored by Shankar–Ganesh
Films about hunters
Films with screenplays by A. K. Lohithadas
Films shot in Kerala
Films shot in Palakkad
Films shot in Munnar
Films directed by I. V. Sasi